Drama is a Spanish streaming television series produced by RTVE and El Terrat which stars Elisabet Casanova, Artur Busquets and Júlia Bonjoch. It features both Catalan and Spanish language dialogue, with roughly a 70%–30% distribution. Originally released in RTVE's Playz in February 2020, its subsequent broadcasting run on the Catalan regional broadcaster TV3 generated controversy in Catalonia.

Premise 
The fiction follows África, a 23-year-old woman living in Barcelona in an apartment shared with Jordi (Artur Busquets) and Scarlett (Júlia Bonjoch) who gets pregnant but she does not know by whom.

Cast 
Starring
  as África.
 Artur Busquets as Jordi.
 Júlia Bonjoch as Scarlett.
Other

Production and release 
The series was shot with a 70% share of the dialogue in Catalan and a 30% in Spanish. Consisting of 6 episodes featuring a running time of around 25 minutes, the series premiered on 4 February 2020 on Playz, RTVE's platform dedicated to streaming content for young people.

RTVE granted TV3 the broadcasting rights of the series in exchange for the first season of Merlí. The first two episodes debuted in prime time on TV3 on 29 June 2020. The airing of the first two episodes on TV3 sparked a great deal of controversy and public debate in Catalonia, with online critics decrying the presence of the Spanish language in the Catalan public broadcaster surfaced, further increasing after the Catalan culture minister Mariàngela Vilallonga joined the critics, defending that "there is too much Castilian (Spanish) in TV3".

References 

Playz original programming
2020s Spanish comedy television series
2020 Spanish television series debuts
Television shows set in Barcelona
Catalan-language television shows
Spanish-language television shows